Parachondrostoma turiense is a species of ray-finned fish in the family Cyprinidae.
It is found only in Spain. Its natural habitat is rivers. It is threatened by habitat loss.

Description 
Elongated body with relatively small head and mouth situated on the bottom. Usually not exceed 300 mm total length. The bottom lip is thick and has a curved-shaped lamina cornea, unlike the
Iberian Nase whose lamina cornea is straight. Caudal peduncle long and narrow. The fins are long, the dorsal one has 8 branched rays and anal one 8 to 10. The scales are large and 44 to 45. The number of pharyngeal teeth more frequent is 6-5 and rarely 6-6.

Habitat and ecology 
It is a species typically lives in running water but can survive in still waters and even in reservoirs where it can be traced upstream in the breeding season.

Reproduction 
Almost no information on the species. We only know that reaches back rivers to the upper for spawning and that it takes place between March and May in shallow water with stone or gravel.

Distribution 
It is endemic to the Iberian peninsula, been present in the basins of the rivers Turia and Mijares.

Factors of threat 
• About the species: the introduction of exotic species, most fish-eating in the Spanish rivers is the main threat.
• On the habitat: the main threats are: the completion of various water-related infrastructure such as pipelines, dams, etc., Pollution from industrial urban and agricultural discharges, water withdrawals for agriculture and the extraction of aggregates that destroys spawning.

Conservation measures 
Control of the discharge and treatment of them. Adequately correct the impacts of water infrastructure. Do not make irrigation concessions when water go down to lower levels suitable for fish life. Address the impact of aggregate extraction in rivers and only give the necessary concessions. Perform control of alien species by the government. Preventing the introduction of new alien species stating the new and most existing ones already in Spain like not fishable. Tracking the evolution of populations of this species.

References

External links 

Parachondrostoma
Fish described in 1987
Taxonomy articles created by Polbot